With the exception of a railway system, Jordan has a developed public and private transportation system. There are three international airports in Jordan. The Hedjaz Jordan Railway runs one passenger train a day each way.

Roadways 
In 2009, it was estimated that Jordan had  of paved highways. Some of the major highways in Jordan are:
 Highway 15 (Desert Highway): connects the Syrian border with Amman and to the port city of Aqaba on the Gulf of Aqaba. It is a four-lane, double carriageway road almost on its entirety, from the Syrian border until the junction with the road to Petra.
 Highway 35 (King's Highway): connects Irbid in the northern region to Aqaba, it takes the name and route of the historic King's Highway. It has four lanes on double carriageway on its stretch from Irbid until Amman.
 Highway 65 (Dead Sea Highway): connects Aqaba to the northwestern region of Jordan.
 The first part of the highway (Safi-Aqaba) was constructed in 1978 as part of the Red Sea - Dead Sea Access. It connected Safi, the south end of Dead Sea to Aqaba, the north point of Red Sea.
 Jordan Highway: encircles the city of Amman and connects it to Jerash and Irbid

Railways

Pipelines 
gas 473 km; oil 49 km

Ports and harbors 
The port of Aqaba on the Gulf of Aqaba is the only sea port in Jordan.

Merchant marine 
total:
ships by type (1999):
bulk carrier 2, cargo ship 2, container ship 1, livestock carrier 1, roll-on/roll-off ship 1 
The governments of Jordan, Egypt, and Iraq own and operate the Arab Bridge Maritime company, which is the largest passenger transport company on the Red Sea.

Airports 

18 as of 2012

Airports - with paved runways
As of 2012, there was a total of 16 airports, the main airports being:
 Queen Alia International Airport in Amman.
 King Hussein International Airport in Aqaba
 Amman Civil Airport in Amman
 Muwaffaq Salti Air Base: A military airport in Azraq

total (2012):
16
over :
8
:
5
under :
1

Airports - with unpaved runways 
total (2012):
2
under :
2

Heliports (2016) 
56

Maps 
 UNHCR Atlas Map - most stations unnamed

See also 

 Arab Mashreq International Railway
 Jordan
 Red Sea–Dead Sea Access

References

External links 

 Hejaz RR Map